Dogtanian and the Three Muskehounds (Spanish: D'Artacán y los Tres Mosqueperros; Japanese: ワンワン三銃士 Wan Wan Sanjuushi, lit., Woof Woof Three Musketeers) is a children's animated television series that adapts the classic 1844 Alexandre Dumas story of d'Artagnan and The Three Musketeers, produced by Spanish studio BRB Internacional with animation by Japanese studio Nippon Animation, that was first broadcast on MBS in Japan in 1981–82.

Most of the characters in the series are anthropomorphizations of dogs, hence the title of the cartoon; although there are a few exceptions, most notably Dogtanian's two sidekicks Pip the mouse and Planchet the bear, among several others.

In 1985, BRB Internacional released a television film edited from the series entitled Dogtanian: Special. In 1989, they produced with Televisión Española and Thames Television a sequel series entitled The Return of Dogtanian. In 1995, they released a television film edited from the sequel series entitled Dogtanian: One For All and All For One. In 2021, Apolo Films (BRB International's cinema studio) and Cosmos Maya released a feature-length CGI film entitled Dogtanian and the Three Muskehounds in cinemas.

Plot
The story, set in 17th-century France, follows a young Dogtanian (D'Artagnan (ダルタニヤン) in the original Japanese version and voiced by Satomi Majima (間嶋 里美) and D'Artacán in the Spanish version) who travels from Béarn to Paris in order to become one of King Louis XIII of France's musketeers. (They are referred to as musketeers throughout the cartoon and only the title calls them 'Muskehounds'.) He quickly befriends three musketeers (Porthos, Athos and Aramis), saving Juliette, a maid-in-waiting for Queen Anne of Austria. A key difference between the Dogtanian adaptions and Dumas' novel is that the character traits of Athos and Porthos were interchanged, making Athos the extrovert and Porthos the secretive noble of the group.

Production
The series was produced in 1981 by BRB International and Nippon Animation and it was first broadcast by MBS in Japan, where it began airing on 9 October 1981. One year after its premiere, it was broadcast for the first time in Spain on Televisión Española's Primera Cadena starting on 9 October 1982. The partnership between BRB International and Nippon Animation worked so well, that they collaborated in another successful animated series two years later called Around the World with Willy Fog.

The series was dubbed into English by Intersound USA in 1985. As well as dubbing the TV series, BRB also produced a TV movie, which was again dubbed by Intersound USA. The series was first broadcast in the United Kingdom on BBC starting on 3 January 1985.

Nowadays the series is still being broadcast on different platforms such as YouTube and Netflix.

Spanish team 
 Production company: BRB Internacional S.A
 Executive producer: Claudio Biern Boyd
 Director: Luis Ballester
 Dialogue adaptation: Manuel Peiro
 Music editing: Cabum Magister
 Sound technicians: Eduardo Fernández, Alfonso Pino, José María San Mateo, José Esquirol
 Sound: Estudios Exa, S.A.
 Lab: Fotofilm Madrid, S.A.
 Editing: Soledad López
 Editing assistant: Alicia Saavedra
 Effects: Luis Castro

Japanese team 
 Production company: Nippon Animation
 Executive producers: Endo Shigeo, Junzo Nakajima
 Director: Taku Sugiyama, Shigeo Koshi
 Screenplay: Akira Nakahara, Taku Sugiyama, Yoshihiro Kimura
 Music: Katsuhisa Hattori
 Character design: Shuuichi Seki
 Storyboard: Taku Sugiyama, Shigeo Koshi, Fumio Kurokawa, Suzuki, Baba Ken, Saito Shuhokaku
 Layout supervision: Koji Mori
 Animation director: Takao Ogawa
 Art director: Kobayashi Shichiro, Kazue Ito
 Color: Takasago Yoshiko
 Animation: Sakai Shunichi, Kimura Keiichiro
 Additional animation: Anime R

English adaptation 
 Directed by: Tom Wyner, Robert Barron, Byrd Ehlmann, Dave Mallow & Doug Stone
 Written by: Tom Wyner, Jason Klassi, Garry Morris, Melesio Rosales, Dayna Barron, Byrd Ehlmann

Music

Spanish opening and ending 
 Composed by: Guido and Maurizio de Angelis
 Sung by: Popitos

Japanese opening:  
 Lyrics: Kayama Yoshiko
 Lyrics & Arrangement: Katsuhisa Hattori
 Sung by: Kusaka Marron
 Chorus: Suginami Children Choir

Japanese ending:  
 Lyrics: Kayama Yoshiko
 Lyrics & Arrangement: Katsuhisa Hattori
 Sung by: Kusaka Marron

English opening and ending 
 Edited by: Cabum Magister
 Subpublished by: Southern Pictures Music Inc.
 Sung by: Hilary Mather, Elissa Mather, Ted Mather
 Recorded and re-mixed at: Fizz Sound Creation, Intersound Inc.

Cast

 Aramis – Eddie Frierson
 Juliette – Rebecca Forstadt
 Pip – Steve Kramer
 Widimer – Mike Reynolds
 Cardinal Richelieu – Kerrigan Mahan
 Queen Anne – Robin Levenson
 King Louis – Simon Prescott
 Narrator – Michael McConnohie
 Dogtanian – Cam Clarke
 Porthos – Dan Woren
 Athos – Michael Sorich
 Blue Falcon – Robert Axelrod
 Planchet – Milton James
 Pig Guard – Richard Epcar
 Count Rochefort – Dave Mallow
 Monsieur Treville – Michael Forest 
 Milady – Edie Mirman
 Rochefort's henchman – Theodore Lehmann
 Duke of Buckingham – Tom Wyner

Episode list
 "Dogtanian's Trip"
 "Dogtanian Mysterious Black Moustache's Knight"
 "Paris, the Dream City"
 "The Three Invincible Muskehounds"
 "Monsieur Treville, Captain of the Muskehounds"
 "Dogtanian Against The Three Muskehounds"
 "Louis XIII The Just"
 "Juliette's Secret"
 "Juliette Kidnapped"
 "The Great Getaway"
 "Milady, the Hipnotizer"
 "Dogtanian in Love"
 "Pip's Debut"
 "Seeking Juliet"
 "Dogtanian's Great Feat"
 "The Queen's Diamonds of Tears"
 "The Queen's Missing Necklace in the Midst"
 "Hurry, Before the Valtz Stars"
 "The Feat Trial"
 "Dogtanian and the Blue Falcon"
 "The Misterious Ghost Ship"
 "Dogtanian in the Jungle"
 "Toll Not Ye Bells"
 "The Fake Count the Rochefort"
 "Milady's Poison"
 "Congratulations, Muskehound Dogtanian"

Accolades
 Bronze medal at the 1982 International Film & TV Festival of New York.
 Honorable mention at the 7th international 'Child of Our Time' festival, Milan.
 TP de Oro award for most popular children's series.
 Special award in the International Contest for Children & Youth of Gijón.

Home media

UK VHS releases
In the UK during the late 1980s, Video Collection International Ltd released numerous video releases of Dogtanian and the Three Muskehounds after its broadcast on BBC from 1985 to 1987 and its latest reruns on ITV from 1988 to 1990.

DVD releases
The series has now been released on DVD in the UK by Revelation Films in Region 0 format:
 Episodes 1–9: 28 April 2003
 Episodes 10–15: 25 August 2003
 Episodes 16–20: 22 March 2004
 Episodes 21–26: 25 May 2004
 Dogtanian - The Complete Series Boxset: 20 September 2004
 The television films Dogtanian: Special and Dogtanian: One For All And All For One. 26 July 2004.

In November 2010, a version that contains both series and both television films was released exclusively for HMV. Later, the complete boxset was made available at other retailers.

The complete series was released on DVD in the U.S. in 2012 by Oasis DVDs.

Soundtrack
The original version of the soundtrack to Dogtanian (called Dartacan Soundtrack) can be downloaded from Amazon's UK website in MP3 format. It includes an English version of the theme song that uses the second series opening lyrics, but the music is similar to the original opening, in this version Dogtanian however is referred to as Dartacan, his Spanish name, and the theme is sung with very high voices, similar to the original opening, and rendered in a style reminiscent of the French dub. An insert song in Spanish which has been replicated twice (Richelieu and Bulibu, probably an error on Amazon's part or that of the record company) and a few instrumental tracks that are heard in the show itself and one unused instrumental track.

Television film
In 1985, BRB Internacional released a television film edited from the series entitled Dogtanian: Special.

Sequel

In 1989 a sequel series entitled The Return of Dogtanian was produced by BRB Internacional, Televisión Española and Thames Television with animation of Wang Film Productions and Morning Sun Animation. Like the first series, 26 episodes were produced.

In 1995, BRB Internacional released a television film edited from this second series entitled Dogtanian: One For All and All For One.

Film

According to their main website, BRB Internacional was planning a new feature-length CGI film to be released in 2016, but it was delayed for unknown reasons. In April 2019, it was announced that Apolo Films, their new cinema studio, has since taken over production of the film. On 11 February 2020, the first image of the film was revealed. The film is written by Doug Langdale and directed by Toni Garcia. The film was released on theatres under the title Dogtanian and the Three Muskehounds. It was released on SVOD.

The film maintains the original series opening main theme tune composed by Guido and Maurizio De Angelis. Additionally, they have composed new songs for the film.

The film was released in the United Kingdom on 25 June 2021.

References

External links
 Official page at BRB International
  Official Japanese at Nippon Animation
 
 Muskehounds.com
 
 Dogtanian.net

Japanese children's animated action television series
Japanese children's animated comedy television series
Japanese children's animated fantasy television series
Spanish children's animated action television series
Spanish children's animated comedy television series
Spanish children's animated fantasy television series
Nippon Animation
Animated television series about dogs
Television shows based on The Three Musketeers
Shōnen manga
Fictional anthropomorphic characters
Fictional dogs
Historical anime and manga
Period television series
Television shows set in France
Television series set in the 17th century
Cultural depictions of Cardinal Richelieu
Cultural depictions of Louis XIII
Australian Broadcasting Corporation original programming